Benjamín Rausseo Rodríguez (born January 26, 1961) is a Venezuelan artist, stand-up comedian and career humorist best known for his character El Conde del Guácharo (translation: "The Count of Guacharo").

Biography
Benjamín Rausseo was born into poverty in the rural community of Musipán in the state of Monagas. 
He pursued university studies as an actor and, in 1981, presented as his graduation thesis a comedic monologue "el Conde del Guácharo." The "Conde" or Count became a TV personality and made Rausseo one of Venezuela's most successful stand-up comedians.  Beyond comedy he was also a dare-devil and stunt performer in the television variety show Sabado Sensacional. In 2006 Rausseo was studying law and was one semester from graduating with a JD from the Universidad Santa María de Caracas. Rausseo owns a theme park in Isla Margarita called Musipán.

Presidential aspirations
In July 2006, he announced that he was running for president under his newly formed "Piedra Party," as a protest against the state of politics in Venezuela, and to challenge the presidency of Hugo Chavez.

Three weeks before the election, in accordance with a campaign pledge he had made earlier (to stand down if not placed first or second in the opinion polls), he withdrew his candidacy without endorsing either Chávez or Rosales, telling his supporters to vote for either.

References

External links
Musipan Theme Park Official Site

People from Monagas
Venezuelan humorists
1961 births
Living people
Venezuelan politicians
Venezuelan satirists
Venezuelan businesspeople
Black comedy